Klyashevo (Keläş) is a rural locality (a selo) in Arovsky Selsoviet, Chishminsky District, Bashkortostan, Russia. The population was 560 as of 2010. There are 18 streets.

Geography 
Klyashevo is located 23 km east of Chishmy (the district's administrative centre) by road. Dubrava is the nearest rural locality.

References 

Rural localities in Chishminsky District